Diana Gibson (March 21, 1915 – October 12, 1991) was an American film actress.

The daughter of Mr. and Mrs. M. E. LaBie, Gibson was born Rosemary LaBie in Chicago, Illinois. Her name was changed when she signed a contract with Universal in 1935. She arrived in Los Angeles as a result of winning a beauty contest sponsored by the Balaban and Katz theater corporation. She was a night club dancer before she started her film career in 1935 with a role in His Night Out, starring Edward Everett Horton and Irene Hervey. She appeared in nine film roles in 1936, four of which were uncredited. She starred opposite John Wayne in the 1937 film Adventure's End, which would be her best known role. That year she appeared in six films, in five credited roles.

However, in 1938 and 1939 her career took a downward turn, and she only appeared in three films over the two years; two of her roles were uncredited. Her last credited role was in the 1938 film Western Welcome starring Ray Whitley. She retired from films afterward.

In 1954, Gibson began hosting The Talk of the Town, a new program on WLBR-TV in Lancaster, Pennsylvania. She had been hostess of Know Your Hospital.

Gibson was married to Jack Schropp, who was an actor but later became general manager of the Lebanon News Publishing Company in Pennsylvania. She was the corporation's treasurer. The couple lived in Key Largo, Florida, from 1983 until he died in 1986. She eventually settled in Coral Gables, Florida, where she was residing at the time of her death in 1991.

Filmography

References

External links

1915 births
1991 deaths
American film actresses
Actresses from Illinois
Actors from Coral Gables, Florida
20th-century American actresses